David Amsalem (born on 4 September 1971 in Israel) is an Israeli retired footballer.

Career
He started his career with Bnei Yehuda and then joined Hapoel Tel Aviv whom he played for during the 1994–1995 season. He became the second Israeli to join Crystal Palace following Itzik Zohar who left just as Amsalem was signing.

Terry Venables signed Amsalem from Beitar Jerusalem for £800,000 in 1998 via a third party at a time when Amsalem was captain of the Israeli national side. Controversy surrounded his signing as there were claims the money never reached Beitar. Beitar chairman Ehud Federman said that his contract had run out and had left the club on a free transfer.

He played for Beitar Jerusalem for three seasons 1995–1998. He started six games for Palace and played in a total of ten games for them. He was released from the club in 1999 and joined Hapoel Haifa who he played for until the end of the 1999–2000 season.

He made his return to Beitar Jerusalem in 2000 and played there for eight-and-a-half seasons, until  he retired in July 2009, to become assistant coach at the club.

Honours
Israeli Premier League (4):
1996–97, 1997–98, 2006–07, 2007–08
Toto Cup (1):
1997–98
Israel State Cup (2):
2008, 2009

External links
  Profile and statistics of David Amsalem on One.co.il
 
 

1971 births
Living people
Israeli footballers
Israel international footballers
Bnei Yehuda Tel Aviv F.C. players
Hapoel Tel Aviv F.C. players
Beitar Jerusalem F.C. players
Crystal Palace F.C. players
Hapoel Haifa F.C. players
Beitar Jerusalem F.C. managers
English Football League players
Israeli expatriate footballers
Expatriate footballers in England
Israeli expatriate sportspeople in England
Israeli people of Algerian-Jewish descent
Footballers from Lod
Association football fullbacks
Israeli football managers